dotstokyo or ・・・・・・・・・ was a Japanese idol group active from 2016 to 2019.

Name and members 

There is no official pronunciation of the name — which consists of nine interpuncts originally representing the nine founding members, although the actual number of members varied over the history of the group and ten performers have been in the group in total, albeit not at the same time — but the group has referred to themselves in interviews and online variously as dots, dotstokyo, dotsnine, tenten (a colloquial term for kana voicing marks which are dot-shaped), tenkyu (indicating that there are nine dots but also a pun off "thank you"), and so on.

Discography

Singles

Split single

See also 

 Japanese idols

References

External links 
 Posts about "Dots" on the Homicidols group music blog

Japanese idol groups
Bands with fictional stage personas